Season 1996–97 was difficult for Hibs, as the club finished ninth in the Premier Division and only avoided relegation to the First Division by winning a playoff against Airdrie. There was also disappointment in the cup competitions, as the club were beaten by Celtic in the Scottish Cup, and Rangers in the League Cup. Manager Alex Miller was sacked in late September and replaced temporarily by Jocky Scott, before Jim Duffy took charge.

League season

Results

Final table

Play-offs
Having finished ninth in the Scottish Premier Division, Hibs then had to contest a relegation / promotion play-off with Airdrie, who had finished second in the 1996–97 Scottish First Division. Hibs won 1–0 at Easter Road and 4–2 at Broadwood Stadium to retain their place in the Premier Division, with a 5–2 aggregate victory.

Results

Scottish League Cup
Hibs reached the quarter finals thanks to two wins against lower division opposition, but then lost 4–0 to eventual winners Rangers.

Results

Scottish Cup
Hibs defeated Aberdeen after a penalty shootout in third round, but then lost in a fourth round replay to Celtic.

Results

See also
List of Hibernian F.C. seasons

References

External links
Hibernian 1996/1997 results and fixtures, Soccerbase

Hibernian F.C. seasons
Hibernian